County Buildings (also known as the Former County Buildings) is a Grade II listed building in Wrexham, Wrexham County Borough, Wales. It houses the Wrexham County Borough Museum and Wrexham Archives. It is proposed that a Football Museum for Wales be housed in the building. The building is located between Saint Mark's Road and Regent Street in the city centre and Offa, bounded by Wrexham Cathedral to the west.

Description 
The building is located on the corner of Saint Mark's Road and Regent Street, in the city centre of Wrexham and in the community of Offa. The Cathedral Church of Our Lady of Sorrows is located to its west also on Regent Street.

Former County Buildings is two-stories, with a five-bay entrance front which is flanked either side by advanced gabled ranges. The building's architecture is of a Tudor gothic style. The building is composed of roughtly coursed and squared stone with freestone dressings and steep slate roofs with coped gables, axial and end wall stack with chamfered shafts. The central gable located above the main entrance in loggia (now glazed) is composed of five bays of chamfered depressed gothic arches, between small buttresses. Also above the main entrance is a four-light oriel window, with a leaded roof, flanked by three-light windows either side, all with mullions and transoms. The lower gabled wings are also of similar detail, the right hand gable is advanced from the main range and houses the entrance to the No. 1 court in its own gabled rear wing. The left hand range clasps the outer angle of the main front, and there is a further wing located at its rear, parallel to the main range. The building has a chamfered buttressed tower, with a deep moulded arched doorway and a staircase under a sloping, embattled roofline with stepped windows.

Internally, the building's layout was modified in 1980, with rooms enlarged, a circulation space created and the courtyard enclosed.

History 
The building was built as a militia barracks between 1857 and 1858 to the architectural designs of Thomas Penson. The Royal Denbighshire Militia relocated their armoury from Chester Castle, including their guns and ammunition, to the upstairs room of the building, now known as Court Room 1. The building also provided as the home for the militia's officers, whereas the soldiers resided in houses around the then town and trained for one month annually. The militia vacated the building in 1877, moving to the Hightown Barracks.

In around 1879, the building was converted to a divisional police station of the Denbighshire Constabulary and a magistrates' court. The building was remodelled internally and externally to have two court rooms and a number of cells on the ground-floor for individuals on remand or accommodated overnight when showing signs of alcohol intoxication. In the 1901 census, three prisoners were held in the building on census day. The exercise yard for prisoners is present today and surrounded by high walls to prevent escape.

In the 1890s the building was extended and the extension later used as council offices.

In 1976–77, North Wales Police, which the Denbighshire Constabulary was absorbed into, relocated to Bodhyfryd police station,  to the north-east, leaving the County Buildings vacant. Between 1977 and 1996, parts of the building were part of a local art college.

In 1996, following the formation of Wrexham County Borough from Clwyd, the building opened as the Wrexham County Borough Museum and Archives. The building was refurbished in 2010–11, adding a front extension and now contains the Courtyard Cafe.

It is proposed that the building host the Football Museum for Wales on the vacant upper parts of the building, and is projected to open in 2024. Wrexham was chosen as the location for a national football museum, due to Wrexham's football heritage which includes the founding of the FAW in Wrexham in 1876, and having the oldest Welsh club, as well as oldest football ground in Wales.

References 

Grade II listed buildings in Wrexham County Borough
Government buildings completed in 1857